Peter Hasten Daly is a retired United States Navy vice admiral who served as Deputy Commander and Chief of Staff, U.S. Fleet Forces Command. He is currently the CEO of the United States Naval Institute.

Personal life
Daly was born in Chicago, Illinois. Daly graduated in 1977 from the College of the Holy Cross with a Bachelor of Arts in Economics. In 1983 he earned a master's degree in Operations Analysis from the Naval Postgraduate School.

Career
Upon graduation from College of the Holy Cross, Daly commissioned as an Ensign in the United States Navy through the Naval Reserve Officer Training Corps.

Daly commanded the destroyer  from the early stages as a pre-commissioning unit through commissioning, culminating with a successful deployment to the Persian Gulf taking part in combat operations in support of Operation Desert Strike.

He commanded Destroyer Squadron 31 serving as sea combat commander for Abraham Lincoln Battle Group during Rim of the Pacific 2000, and throughout a Persian Gulf deployment supporting Operation Southern Watch.

His shore assignments include flag aide to Commander, Naval Surface Force, U.S. Atlantic Fleet, in the Surface Warfare Programs and Budget Division (OP-30); deputy executive assistant to the Vice Chief of Naval Operations, on the Joint Staff as a program analyst and executive assistant to the Director of Force Structure, Resources, and Assessments (J-8); executive assistant to the Commander of the Pacific Fleet; and, later, as executive assistant to the Commander of the U.S. Pacific Command.

As a flag officer, he served as deputy director for Resources and Acquisition (J-8) in the Joint Staff and then served as senior military assistant to the Secretary of the Navy.

Returning to sea, he served as commander, Carrier Strike Group 11. During this tour, he deployed to 5th and 7th Fleet Areas of Responsibility executing combat operations in support of Operations Enduring and Iraqi Freedom.  As Commander, Carrier Strike Group 11, he led Task Forces 50, 152, and 58 in support of Operation Iraqi Freedom and maritime interception operations in the Persian Gulf.

In August 2008, he reported for duty as deputy commander, U.S. Fleet Forces Command.

References

External links

1955 births
Living people
College of the Holy Cross alumni
Naval Postgraduate School alumni
United States Navy vice admirals
Recipients of the Defense Superior Service Medal
Recipients of the Legion of Merit
Military personnel from Chicago